Biscoe Township, population 5,765, is one of eleven townships in Montgomery County, North Carolina, United States. The Towns of Biscoe and Candor are located in this township.

Geography
Biscoe Township is drained mainly by Cedar Creek, Bridgers Creek, and Big Creek, all of which drain to the Little River of the Pee Dee River.  The northeast side of the township is drained by Lick Creek and Cabin Creek in the Deep River watershed.

References

Townships in Montgomery County, North Carolina
Townships in North Carolina